Nervion is a river in the Basque Country.

Nervión may also refer to:

Nervión, Seville, a district of Seville, Spain
Nervión (Seville Metro) station